Still Life is a 1657 oil painting by Pieter Claesz.

References

1627 paintings
Paintings in the collection of the Timken Museum of Art